USS Branch may refer to the following ships and other vessels:

United States Navy 
 , a Clemson-class destroyer commissioned in 1920, transferred to Royal Navy as HMS Beverley, and sunk by U-188 in 1943
 , a Clemson-class destroyer that was renamed S. P. Lee prior to launch